Danocrania is an extinct genus of brachiopods from the Upper Cretaceous and Lower Paleocene of Europe and Australia. The shell is round to rounded square. The dorsal valve is covered in fine pustules or spines.

References 

Prehistoric brachiopod genera
Cretaceous brachiopods
Prehistoric animals of Europe
Paleogene brachiopods
Craniata